Kemalettin Sami Gökçen (1884 – 15 April 1934) was a Turkish career officer and politician. He was instrumental in establishing diplomatic relations between the Turkish Republic and Nazi Germany.

Gallery

See also
List of high-ranking commanders of the Turkish War of Independence

Sources

External links

1884 births
1934 deaths
People from Sinop, Turkey
People from Kastamonu vilayet
Ottoman Imperial School of Military Engineering alumni
Ottoman Military College alumni
Ottoman Army officers
Ottoman military personnel of the Balkan Wars
Ottoman military personnel of World War I
Turkish military personnel of the Greco-Turkish War (1919–1922)
Recipients of the Medal of Independence with Red Ribbon (Turkey)
Turkish Army generals
Deputies of Sinop
20th-century Turkish diplomats
Ambassadors of Turkey to Germany
Burials at Turkish State Cemetery